National Highway 134, commonly referred to as NH 134 is a national highway in  India. It is a spur road of National Highway 34. NH-134 traverses the state of Uttarakhand

Route 
Dharasu - Kuthnaur - Yamnotri.

Junctions 

  Terminal near Dharasu.

Silkyara Bend - Barkot Tunnel 
Cabinet Committee on Economic Affairs approved Silkyara Bend - Barkot Tunnel in Uttarakhand in February 2018. The tunnel will be 4.531 km long, 2-Lane Bi-Directional with escape passage including approaches. The total project cost is Rs. 1383.78 crore while tunnel project will cost Rs. 1119.69 crore. The tunnel will reduce the travel distance from Dharasu to Yamunotri by about 20 km and travel time by about an hour and provide all weather connectivity.

See also 

 List of National Highways in India
 List of National Highways in India by state

References

External links 
 NH 134 on OpenStreetMap
 Rationalisation of Numbering Systems of National Highways, Department of Road Transport and Highways

National highways in India
National Highways in Uttarakhand